The 2004 United States presidential election in Nebraska took place on November 2, 2004, and was part of the 2004 United States presidential election. Voters chose five electors to the Electoral College, who voted for president and vice president. However, this state is one of the two states of the U.S. that, starting in the 2004 election, instead of giving all of its electors to the winner based on its statewide results, just two of them vote based on the statewide results, and the others vote based on their individual congressional district results.

Nebraska, a rural Great Plains state, is a Republican and conservative stronghold. Voters here gave an overwhelming victory to George W. Bush, who received more than twice the number of votes of his challenger, John F. Kerry. Bush who carried the state in 2000 increased his margin of victory, from 29% (2000) to 33% in 2004. Bush carried every congressional district, and every county except substantially Native American Thurston County which Kerry won by a narrow 2.43 percent margin.

With 65.9% of the popular vote, Nebraska would prove to be Bush's fourth strongest state in the 2004 election after Utah, Wyoming and Idaho. This is the last time anyone won Nebraska with more than 60% of the vote.

Predictions 
There were 12 news organizations who made state-by-state predictions of the election. Here are their last predictions before election day.

Results

By congressional district
Bush won all three congressional districts.

By county

Counties that flipped from Republican to Democratic
 Thurston (largest municipality: Pender)

See also
 United States presidential elections in Nebraska
 Presidency of George W. Bush

References

Nebraska
2004
Presidential